Pink Mammoth is a San Francisco-based non-profit artist collective, founded by Ryel Kestano and Derek Hena in August, 2003. It is based partially on the philosophy of Burning Man, a radically expressive temporary city held annually in the Black Rock Desert of Nevada, and dedicated to unconditional self-support and free expression. It also is influenced by the Buddhist concept of the Boddhisattva, a being dedicated to enabling, supporting, and encouraging others to reach their ultimate state of enlightenment.

The organization has maintained active residencies throughout San Francisco and has performed at significant San Francisco dance music venues including Mighty, Monarch, Public Works, Monroe, Supperclub, Mezzanine, Halcyon, Public Works, The Midway, The Great Northern, and Audio. These highlight the organization's heavy emphasis on community and expressive celebration by showcasing and promoting its own artist-participants, including DJs, percussionists, vocalists, live event artists, fabric designers, and graphic artists.

Pink Mammoth also participates in Burning Man, the Love Parade, and many regional burns such as Apogaea. Its participants have represented the collective in Mexico, London, Canada, Japan, New Zealand, and throughout the United States.

References

External links
http://www.pinkmammoth.org

American artist groups and collectives
Culture of San Francisco
Burning Man
Arts organizations based in the San Francisco Bay Area
Arts organizations established in 2003
2003 establishments in California